Penmetsa, Penumatsa, Penmatsa or Penmethsa is a surname of Indian origin of people belonging to Raju caste of Andhra Pradesh. People with this surname include:

 Penmetsa Ram Gopal Varma, Indian film director and producer
 Penmetsa Satyanarayana Raju, Chief Justice of Andhra Pradesh High Court, India
 Penmetsa Subbaraju, Indian actor